Bengal Provincial Railway  was a  narrow-gauge railway from Tarakeswar  to Magra, in Indian state of West Bengal.

History
The Bengal Provincial Railway opened in 1895 from Tarakeswar on the East Indian Railway to Magra,  which was on the East Indian Railway broad gauge. The railway mostly used small  locomotives. There also was a branch line from Dashghora to Jamalpur.

Rolling stock

In 1936, the company owned three locomotives, 31 coaches and 69 goods wagons.

Classification
It was labeled as a Class III railway according to Indian Railway Classification System of 1926.

Closure
Increasing losses post World War 2 led to its closure in 1956.

References 

2 ft 6 in gauge railways in India
Defunct railway companies of India